Ellis Jacqueline O'Reilly (born ) is a retired English-born female artistic gymnast, who represented Ireland at international competitions, most notably at the 2016 Olympic Games. She has competed at world championships, including the 2014 World Artistic Gymnastics Championships in Nanning, China. She was a three time silver medalist at the Northern European Championships. In 2017, O'Reilly announced her retirement from the sport, at the age of nineteen.

Career
Ellis trained in the Europa Gymnastics club, in Crayford, under coach Sam James. While competing in Ireland she represented Renmore Gymnastics Club in Renmore, County Galway.
Ellis has a number of national titles to her name and was the 2014 & 2015 All Around Irish Champion. She made her International senior debut in Sofia, Bulgaria in 2014 at the European Championships. Since then Ellis has attended two World Championships (China in 2014 and in Glasgow in 2015). Another European Championships in Monpellier in 2015 and she competed at the inaugural Baku Games in 2015. At the Northern Europeans in Limerick in 2015, O’Reilly claimed a number of silver medals including Individual All Around and with the Irish Team.

Olympic Games 2016
At the World Championships in Glasgow in October 2015, Ellis secured Ireland their first ever place for an Irish female gymnast at an Olympic test event. In March 2016, she was selected as the gymnast to take that place and go forward to compete for a place at the Rio Olympics 2016.
O'Reilly became the first Irish female gymnast to ever secure Olympic qualification at the Aquecce Rio Test Event, the final qualifying event for the Rio de Janeiro games.

Personal life
Ellis took up the sport of gymnastics at age six.
She qualifies for Ireland through her County Armagh-born grandfather.
O'Reilly previously represented both Great Britain and Northern Ireland.

O'Reilly is currently studying for her A-levels and is aiming at earning a place in university to study physical education.
Her older sister Jenna is a four-time amateur British boxing champion so she was given the honour of leading Katie Taylor into the ring for her gold medal fight in London 2012. O'Reilly also has two younger brothers, Frank and Reggie, who are boxers.

References

1998 births
Living people
Irish female artistic gymnasts
Gymnasts at the 2016 Summer Olympics
Olympic gymnasts of Ireland
Gymnasts at the 2015 European Games
European Games competitors for Ireland
Sportspeople from Kent